The Great Impression is the second full-length studio album by Australian alternative rock band Sparkadia. It was released on 18 March 2011, with "Talking Like I'm Falling Down Stairs" and "China" released as singles prior to the album's release.

The album reached number 8 on the Australian charts and was the week's "feature album" on ABC's Triple J station.

Track listing

Charts

References

2011 albums
Sparkadia albums